Dean John Browne is a former Canadian diplomat. He was Chargé d'affairs a.i. to Guatemala then concurrently Ambassador Extraordinary and Plenipotentiary to Colombia and Ecuador.

External links 
 Foreign Affairs and International Trade Canada Complete List of Posts 

Year of birth missing (living people)
Living people
Ambassadors of Canada to Ecuador
Ambassadors of Canada to Colombia
Ambassadors of Canada to Guatemala